Chen Kuei-miao (1 July 1934 – 15 August 2014) was a Taiwanese politician

While serving as acting Mayor of Tainan in 1985, Chen was affiliated with the Kuomintang. He was first elected to the Legislative Yuan in 1989, and represented Taiwan's 16th district, encompassing Penghu County. He was reelected to the Penghu County legislative seat in 1992, and in the midst of his second term, cofounded the New Party, in 1993. Chen was reelected to a third legislative term in 1995, via the New Party proportional representation party list. Chen was one of many legislators to be implicated in a wide-ranging insider trading scandal that also affected Andrew Oung, among others.

Chen Kuei-miao and other politicians broke away from the ruling Kuomintang in opposition to the rule of then KMT chairman and President of Taiwan, Lee Teng-hui.

Death
Chen died at Cheng Hsin General Hospital in Taipei, Taiwan, on 15 August 2014, at the age of 80. He had suffered from kidney and liver disease.

References

1934 births
2014 deaths
New Party Members of the Legislative Yuan
Mayors of Tainan
Taiwanese political party founders
Politicians of the Republic of China on Taiwan from Tainan
Members of the 1st Legislative Yuan in Taiwan
Members of the 2nd Legislative Yuan
Members of the 3rd Legislative Yuan
Deaths from kidney disease
Deaths from liver disease
Kuomintang Members of the Legislative Yuan in Taiwan
Penghu County Members of the Legislative Yuan
Directors of museums in Taiwan
Leaders of the New Party (Taiwan)